Thomas Rolls Warrington, 1st Baron Warrington of Clyffe, PC (29 May 1851 – 26 October 1937), known as Sir Thomas Warrington between 1904 and 1926, was a British lawyer and judge.

Warrington was called to the Bar, Lincoln's Inn, in 1875, and after acquiring a large practice, became a Queen's Counsel in 1895. In 1904 he was appointed a judge of the Chancery Division of the High Court of Justice and knighted. In 1915 he became a Lord Justice of Appeal and sworn of the Privy Council, which entitled him to sit on the Judicial Committee of the Privy Council.  On his retirement in 1926 he was elevated to the peerage as Baron Warrington of Clyffe, of Market Lavington in the County of Wiltshire.  He continued to sit on the Judicial Committee after his retirement.

Lord Warrington of Clyffe died in October 1937, aged 86, when the barony became extinct.

Judgements
Barron v Potter  [1914] 1 Ch 895 - a UK company law case, concerning the balance of power between the board of directors and the general meeting, and standing for the principle that when the board is incapable of taking action, power to conduct the company's affairs will revert to the general meeting.

References

1851 births
1937 deaths
Barons in the Peerage of the United Kingdom
Members of the Privy Council of the United Kingdom
Members of the Judicial Committee of the Privy Council
Members of Lincoln's Inn
Lords Justices of Appeal
Chancery Division judges
Knights Bachelor
English King's Counsel
People educated at Rugby School
Alumni of Trinity College, Cambridge
Barons created by George V